Bellefontaine Neighbors is an inner-ring suburb city in St. Louis County, Missouri, United States. The population was 10,860 at the 2010 census.

Geography
Bellefontaine Neighbors is a second-ring northern suburb of St. Louis. Bellefontaine Neighbors is located at  (38.748217, -90.227917).

Demographics

2013 American Community Survey
As of the 2013 American Community Survey, the racial makeup of the city was:
73.1% Black or African American
24.3% White
0.1% Asian
0.1% Some other race
2.4% Two or more races
1.1% Hispanic or Latino (of any race)

2010 census
As of the census of 2010, there were 10,860 people, 4,311 households, and 2,784 families living in the city. The racial makeup of the city was 25.7% White, 72.7% African American, 0.1% Native American, 0.2% Asian, 0.2% from other races, and 1.1% from two or more races. Hispanic or Latino of any race were 0.5% of the population.

There were 4,311 households, of which 33.7% had children under the age of 18 living with them, 32.0% were married couples living together, 27.1% had a female householder with no husband present, 5.5% had a male householder with no wife present, and 35.4% were non-families. 31.3% of all households were made up of individuals, and 10.1% had someone living alone who was 65 years of age or older. The average household size was 2.41 and the average family size was 2.98.

The median age in the city was 40.5 years. 23% of residents were under the age of 18; 7.8% were between the ages of 18 and 24; 25.8% were from 25 to 44; 29.5% were from 45 to 64; and 13.8% were 65 years of age or older. The gender makeup of the city was 46.1% male and 53.9% female.

2000 census
As of the census of 2000, there were 11,271 people, 4,388 households, and 2,966 families living in the city. The racial makeup of the city was 53.73% White, 44.41% African American, 0.20% Native American, 0.26% Asian, 0.02% Pacific Islander, 0.31% from other races, and 1.07% from two or more races. Hispanic or Latino of any race were 0.67% of the population.

There were 4,388 households, out of which 32.8% had children under the age of 18 living with them, 42.8% were married couples living together, 20.7% had a female householder with no husband present, and 32.4% were non-families. 29.4% of all households were made up of individuals, and 14.5% had someone living alone who was 65 years of age or older. The average household size was 2.39 and the average family size was 2.93.

In the city, the population was spread out, with 24.1% under the age of 18, 8.2% from 18 to 24, 29.8% from 25 to 44, 20.2% from 45 to 64, and 17.7% who were 65 years of age or older. The median age was 38 years. For every 100 females, there were 88.1 males. For every 100 females age 18 and over, there were 83.2 males.

The median income for a household in the city was $40,007, and the median income for a family was $44,314. Males had a median income of $34,909 versus $26,202 for females. The per capita income for the city was $18,911. About 5.4% of families and 6.5% of the population were below the poverty line, including 7.3% of those under age 18 and 4.7% of those age 65 or over.

Places of interest 

 General Daniel Bissell House, listed on the National Register of Historic Places since November 28, 1978.
 Wilson Larimore House, historic house, and former plantation; listed on the National Register of Historic Places since February 10, 1989.

Notable people
 Tommie Pierson Jr., state representative
 Gina Walsh, state senator

See also 

 National Register of Historic Places listings in St. Louis County, Missouri

References

Cities in St. Louis County, Missouri
Missouri populated places on the Mississippi River
Cities in Missouri